Little River State Park is a campground state park on the 850-acre Waterbury Reservoir in Waterbury, Vermont. It is located in Mount Mansfield State Forest.

Activities includes swimming, boating, fishing, hiking, picnicking, bicycling, wildlife watching, and winter sports.

Facilities include 81 tent/trailer sites, 20 lean-tos, five cabins, restrooms with hot showers, and a dump station. Campers can enjoy swimming beaches, play areas, a boat launch, ball field, and boat rentals. There is a nature center, and park Interpreters offer programs including night hikes, campfire programs, amphibian explorations, and nature crafts and games.

Waterbury Center State Park is a day-use park also located nearby on Waterbury Reservoir.

References

External links
Official website

State parks of Vermont
Protected areas of Washington County, Vermont
Waterbury, Vermont
Nature centers in Vermont